The N77 road is a national secondary road in Ireland.

Upgrades and Extensions
In December 2007 a 4 km stretch at the southern end of the road terminating in Kilkenny city centre was replaced by a new road forming the northeastern section of the Kilkenny ring road and terminating at the N10 national primary road. The N10 forms the southeastern section of the ring road which opened in 1983.
On 28 May 2010, a section of the single carriageway N8 road between Durrow and Portlaoise was redesignated the N77 when the final section of the M8 motorway opened to traffic. In 2018, a new 1.5km of road between Durrow and Ballyragget was opened with higher standard as it replaced the dangerous hilly sections of road.

See also
Roads in Ireland 
Motorways in Ireland
National primary road
Regional road

References
Roads Act 1993 (Classification of National Roads) Order 2006 – Department of Transport

National secondary roads in the Republic of Ireland
Roads in County Kilkenny
Roads in County Laois